Baqerabad (also Romanized as Bāqerābād) is a village in Meshkan Rural District, Poshtkuh District, Neyriz County, Fars Province, Iran. At the 2006 census, its population was 52, in 13 families.

References 

Populated places in Neyriz County